Ketton is a village and civil parish in Rutland in the East Midlands of England. The 2011 Census recorded a parish population of 1,926, making it the fourth largest settlement in Rutland, after Oakham, Uppingham and Cottesmore.

The village has a primary school with 204 children currently on roll.

Ketton gave its name to the Ketton Rural District of Rutland which existed from 1894 to 1974. Ketton ward, which also includes the parishes of Barrowden, Tinwell and Tixover has two councillors on Rutland County Council.

Village
The village's name origin is dubious. Maybe, 'river of Ceta', with the subsequent component later remodelled as the Old English 'tun'. Otherwise, this is potentially an old name for the River Chater or the Old English tribal name, 'Cetan'.

It was originally three separate settlements: Ketton, Aldgate and Geeston; but as they grew they merged to form the village that Ketton is today.

The village has a post office and general store, a library, two pubs (the Railway Inn and the Northwick Arms), a sports centre, a playschool and a Church of England primary school. The village has two churches (Church of England and Methodist).

The earliest parts of St Mary's Church, the Church of England parish church, are 12th century. The church has a central tower and spire. The west front is an example of late 12th century transitional architecture and the remainder of the church is mainly 13th century. The nave was restored under the direction of George Gilbert Scott in 1861–62 and the chancel under the direction of his pupil Thomas Graham Jackson in 1863–66. Jackson's chancel roof was painted by Ninian Comper in 1950. The stone is from Barnack. There are Ketton headstones in the churchyard; one by the lychgate depicts mason's tools and is by stonemason William Hibbins of Ketton. William Hibbins built Hibbins House, which is still standing today. The spire is 144 feet (44 metres) high.

Robert of Ketton was the first person to translate the Qur'an into Latin. The translation was complete by 1143.

Ketton stone and cement

The village gives its name to Ketton stone, a limestone which is quarried locally and is used in many buildings in the village and elsewhere. Some areas of former quarrying, Ketton Quarries, are now a Site of Special Scientific Interest, maintained by Leicestershire and Rutland Wildlife Trust.

The limestone is used to make cement. Ketton Cement Works opened in 1928 and by November that year the number of staff had risen to 250. The plant, owned by Hanson Cement (now part of HeidelbergCement), meets more than 10% of the UK demand for cement.

In 2013 Rutland County Council approved plans for Lark Energy to build a solar farm on land reclaimed from a 1940s quarry. The solar farm provides 13% of the cement work's annual energy consumption. The second phase was opened in 2015 by Secretary of State for Energy Amber Rudd.

Wind energy in Ketton
In 2004 Rutland County Council planning committee resolved to approve a planning application for one wind turbine on land adjacent to the cement works off Steadfold Lane in Ketton. However, issues surrounding fast jets flying from RAF Cottesmore meant that a planning permission was never granted.

In 2011 REG Windpower announced plans to install two wind turbines near Steadfold Lane. The proposal was withdrawn in August 2012.

Transport
Ketton is served by buses on the service between Stamford and Uppingham. Ketton and Collyweston railway station closed in 1966.

References

Further reading

External links

 
Villages in Rutland
Civil parishes in Rutland